Otto Falckenberg (5 October 1873 in Koblenz25 December 1947 in Munich) was a German theatre director, manager and writer. In April 1901, he co-founded Die Elf Scharfrichter, the first political kabarett (a form of cabaret which developed in Germany from 1901). 

1873 births
1947 deaths
German theatre directors
German theatre managers and producers
People from Koblenz
German male stage actors
People from the Rhine Province